Amit Gaurav Yadav is an Indian politician and a member of the Sixteenth Legislative Assembly of Uttar Pradesh in India. He represents the Marhara constituency of Uttar Pradesh and is a member of the Samajwadi Party political party.

Early life and  education
Amit Gaurav was born in Village Ramnagar district Etah. His father was also a MLA, and his brother Shashank Yadav Sheetu is Member of Jila Panchayat Etah. He attended the Dr. Jakir Hussain Islamiya Inter College and is educated till twelfth grade.

Political career
Amit Gaurav has been a MLA for one term. He represented the Marhara constituency and is a member of the Samajwadi Party political party. He is very close to Vikas Yadav.

Posts held

See also

 Marhara (Assembly constituency)
 Sixteenth Legislative Assembly of Uttar Pradesh
 Uttar Pradesh Legislative Assembly

References 

Samajwadi Party politicians
Uttar Pradesh MLAs 2012–2017
People from Etah district
1977 births
Living people